The 1992 Australian Indoor Championships was a men's tennis tournament played on indoor hard courts at the Sydney Entertainment Centre in Sydney, Australia and was part of the Championship Series of the 1992 ATP Tour. It was the 20th edition of the tournament and ran from 5 through 11 October 1992. Second-seeded Goran Ivanišević won the singles title.

Finals

Singles

 Goran Ivanišević defeated  Stefan Edberg 6–4, 6–2, 6–4
 It was Ivanišević's 4th title of the year and the 10th of his career.

Doubles

 Patrick McEnroe /  Jonathan Stark defeated  Jim Grabb /  Richey Reneberg 6–2, 6–3
 It was McEnroe's 2nd title of the year and the 8th of his career. It was Stark's 2nd title of the year and the 2nd of his career.

References

External links
 International Tennis Federation (ITF) – tournament edition details

 
Australian Indoor Championships
Australian Indoor Tennis Championships
Australian Indoor Championships
Sports competitions in Sydney
Tennis in New South Wales